The Tahiti Cup (also known as Coupe de Polynésie or Coupe de Tahiti Nui) is the premier football knockout tournament in French Polynesia. It was created in 1938, and gives the winner of the tournament a berth in the Coupe de France.

Between the years 2001 and 2006 two cup competitions were held in parallel.

List of Winners Coupe de Polynésie / Coupe de Tahiti Nui

1938: Marine
1945: CAICT
1946: Fei Pi
1947: Fei Pi
1948: Fei Pi 
1949: Fei Pi 
1950: Central Sport
1951: Jeunes Tahitiens
1952: Vénus
1953: Central Sport
1954: Central Sport
1955: Fei Pi
1956: Fei Pi
1957: Central Sport
1958: Fei Pi
1959: Fei Pi
1960: Excelsior
1961: Central Sport
1962: Central Sport
1963: Excelsior
1964: Excelsior
1965: Excelsior
1966: Central Sport
1967: Central Sport
1968: Tamarii Punaruu
1969: Tamarii Punaruu
1970: Arue
1971: Jeunes Tahitiens
1972: Central Sport
1973: Central Sport
1974: Vaiete
1975: Central Sport
1976: Central Sport
1977: Central Sport
1978: Pirae
1979: Central Sport
1980: Pirae
1981: Central Sport
1982: Jeunes Tahitiens
1983: Central Sport
1984: Pirae
1985: PTT
1986: PTT
1987: Jeunes Tahitiens
1988: Central Sport
1989: Jeunes Tahitiens
1990: Vénus
1991: Vénus
1992: Vénus
1994: Pirae
1995: Central Sport
1996: Pirae
1997: Dragon
1998: Vénus
1999: Vénus
2000: Pirae
2001: Dragon
2002: Pirae
2003: Manu-Ura
2004: Dragon
2005: Pirae
2006: Temanava
2007: Tefana
2008: Tefana
2009: Manu-Ura
2010: Tefana
2011: Tefana
2012: Tefana
2013: Dragon
2014: Tefana
2015: Pirae
2016: Dragon
2017: Tefana
2018: Dragon
2019: Vénus
2020: abandoned due to COVID-19
2021: Vénus
2022: Vénus

List of Winners Coupe de Tahiti
2001: Vénus
2002: Not Known
2003: Not Known
2004: Tefana
2005: Manu-Ura'''
2006: Tefana

Performances

Performances by club

Top scorers

Most goals in a single season 
 11 goals:
 Teaonui Tehau (2018-19).
Most goals in a single game
 8 goals:
 Marii Taurua (Temanava) 1-13 against Teva, round of 16, season 2016-17.

Hat-tricks

Most hat-tricks in a single season
 8 hat-tricks (2021-22)
Most hat-tricks in a single game
 3 hat-tricks:
 Papara 0-23 Pirae(2019-20), first round, 17 December 2019.

Multiple hat-tricks

See also
Tahiti Ligue 1
Tahiti Coupe des Champions

References

External links
Tahiti – List of Cup Winners, RSSSF.com

 
Football competitions in French Polynesia
National association football cups
Recurring sporting events established in 1938
1938 establishments in French Polynesia
Football cup competitions in Overseas France